Jenő Ádám (12 December 1896 15 May 1982) was a Hungarian music educator, composer, and conductor.

Born in Szigetszentmiklós (Kingdom of Hungary), he studied composition and conducting at the Franz Liszt Academy of Music where he was a pupil of Zoltán Kodály. He later became a longtime teacher at the school and developed a close working relationship with Kodály. Beginning in 1935, the two collaborated on a long term project to reform music teaching in the lower and middle schools.

Many of Ádám's teaching methods and curricula developed during that project were adopted by Kodály and are now a part of the Kodály Method. Ádám was the author of several books on music education that were published in Hungary during the 1940s, two of which were co-authored with Kodály. His methodology has had a profound impact on music education internationally and is still studied today by students of the Kodaly Method. The Organization of American Kodály Educators has established an academic scholarship in his name

Ádám was responsible for the first performances in Hungary of the Dettingen Te Deum and other oratorios by George Frideric Handel, L'enfance du Christ by Hector Berlioz, and Dido and Aeneas by Henry Purcell.

As a composer, he was best known for his operas: Ez a mi földünk (1923), Magyar karácsony (1931) and Mária Veronika (1938), of which the latter two premiered in Budapest at the Royal Hungarian Opera House. He was also the conductor of choirs at the Academy of Music, the chorus master at the Royal Hungarian Opera House, and the conductor of numerous other choirs during his career.

Books
A skálától a szimfóniáig (From the Scale to the Symphony, Budapest, 1943)
Szó-mi (Singing Textbooks for Elementary Schools, Budapest, 1943, with Zoltán Kodály)
Módszeres énektanítás a relatív szolmizáció alapján (Systematic Singing Teaching Based on the Tonic Sol-fa, Budapest, 1944; Eng. trans., 1971 as Growing in Music with Movable Do)
Énekeskönyv (Singing Book, Budapest, 1947, republished in English in March 1998 as Series for elementary schools, with Zoltán Kodály).

References

1896 births
1982 deaths
Franz Liszt Academy of Music alumni
Hungarian classical composers
Hungarian male classical composers
Hungarian conductors (music)
Male conductors (music)
Hungarian music educators
Hungarian opera composers
Male opera composers
20th-century conductors (music)
20th-century classical composers
20th-century Hungarian male musicians